A liquid contact indicator (LCI) is a small indicator that turns from white into another color, typically red, after contact with water. These indicators are small adhesives that are placed on several points within electronic devices such as laptops and smartphones. In case of a defective device, service personnel can check whether the device might have suffered from contact with water, to protect from warranty fraud.

Liquid contact indicators are also known by other names such as water damage tape, water damage sticker, water contact indicator tape, liquid submersion indicator.

Purpose
The main purpose of the liquid contact indicator is to have a lead to the cause of a defect in electronic devices. The LCI can also be used to avoid discussions about liability and warranty, if it is triggered.
Still there can be reasons for doubt.
Longer, but not extreme exposure of a device in a humid environment, can trigger a LCI.
In theory water can reach the LCI(s), but still the electronics underneath it are not touched, for instance when a small drop of rain falls into the headphone connector.
A user should be able to use a device in normal circumstances. For instance a smartphone is normally used while travelling, quite often outside. It can rain, or start to rain outside. A device should not break down immediately. Still such circumstances could trigger the LCI.
So, a liquid contact indicator can be triggered, without pointing to liquids causing a defect.

Forgery
In the simplest form, liquid contact indicators are good for a first lead to the cause of defects. LCIs can be replaced, they are readily available in online electronic stores. But the other interest, use in warranty claims, make them prone to potential misuse. Therefore manufacturers introduced LCIs that are harder to reproduce, even with small holographic details.

Placement
Liquid contact indicators are placed on several places in electronic devices. For example underneath the keyboard in a notebook and on several places on its mainboard. Sometimes the liquid contact indicators are placed in such a way that they can be inspected from the outside. For instance there is a LCI in the headphone connector, the dock connector, and near the SIM-card slot of an Apple iPhone. In a Samsung Galaxy smartphone there is a LCI underneath the battery cover near the battery contacts.

References

 Explanation of a Water Damage Indicator
 http://support.apple.com/kb/ht3302

Sensors
Mobile phones
Portable electronics